Farkhat Musabekovich Musabekov (born 3 January 1994) is a Kyrgyzstani footballer who plays as a winger for Shakhter Karagandy and the national team of Kyrgyzstan.

Career
On 22 July 2021, Musabekov was released from his contract by Dordoi Bishkek.

On 23 July 2021, Musabekov signed for Turan. On 24 June 2022, Musabekov left Turan by mutual agreement.

Career statistics

Club

International

Statistics accurate as of match played 14 June 2022

International goals
Scores and results list Kyrgyzstan's goal tally first.

Honours 
Dordoi Bishkek
 Kyrgyz Premier League (3): 2018, 2019, 2020
 Kyrgyzstan Cup (1): 2018
 Kyrgyzstan Super Cup (2): 2019, 2021

References

External links
 

1994 births
Living people
Sportspeople from Bishkek
Kyrgyzstan international footballers
Association football midfielders
Kyrgyzstani expatriate footballers
Kyrgyzstani footballers
2019 AFC Asian Cup players
Footballers at the 2014 Asian Games
Asian Games competitors for Kyrgyzstan
FC Academia Chișinău players
FC Abdysh-Ata Kant players
FC TSK Simferopol players
FC AGMK players
Moldovan Super Liga players
Expatriate footballers in Moldova
Kyrgyzstani expatriate sportspeople in Moldova
Expatriate footballers in Russia
Kyrgyzstani expatriate sportspeople in Russia
Expatriate footballers in Uzbekistan
Kyrgyzstani expatriate sportspeople in Uzbekistan